Patrick Richard Griffin (May 6, 1893 – June 7, 1927) was a professional baseball pitcher who played in one game for the Cincinnati Reds on July 23, .

External links

1893 births
1927 deaths
Cincinnati Reds players
Major League Baseball pitchers
Baseball players from Ohio